Lajos Leopold Dávid is a male former international table tennis player from Hungary.

Table tennis career
He won eight medals in singles, doubles, and team events in the World Table Tennis Championships in 1930 to 1934.

The eight World Championship medals included four gold medals in the team event for Hungary.

See also
 List of table tennis players
 List of World Table Tennis Championships medalists

References

Hungarian male table tennis players
Living people
Year of birth missing (living people)
Place of birth missing (living people)